The iwato scale is a musical scale that is similar to the Locrian mode (spelled 1 b2 b3 4 b5 b6 b7), seventh mode of the major scale, different in that it has no 3rd or 6th notes, thus making it pentatonic.  Its spelling is therefore 1 b2 4 b5 b7.  It is used in traditional Japanese music for the koto. It is a mode of the Hirajōshi scale.

References

Further reading
Hewitt, Michael. 2013. Musical Scales of the World. The Note Tree. .

Pentatonic scales
Japanese traditional music
Hemitonic scales